Robley Dunglison Evans (18 August 1846 – 3 January 1912), born in Floyd County, Virginia, was a rear admiral in the United States Navy, who served from the American Civil War to the Spanish–American War. In 1907–1908, he commanded the Great White Fleet on its worldwide cruise from the Atlantic Ocean through the Straits of Magellan to the Pacific Ocean.

Naval service
In 1859, Utah Territory delegate William Henry Hooper offered Evans the territory's nomination to the United States Naval Academy. After establishing residency in Utah, he entered the academy in 1860. Evans was ordered to active duty in September 1863 and graduated from the academy in the class of 1864.

American Civil War service

In the attacks on Fort Fisher, North Carolina, during the Second Battle of Fort Fisher, he exhibited great gallantry under fire on 15 January 1865. He led his landing party of United States Marines through heavy fire to charge the Confederate defenses. Evans continued to fight even after his fourth wound, drawing his pistol and threatening to kill any man who attempted to amputate his leg in surgery when he was evacuated.

"Fighting Bob" Evans
Evans held numerous important sea commands during the 1890s. In 1891 and 1892, commanding Yorktown on the Pacific Squadron, he won great acclaim for his firm and skillful handling of a tense situation with Chile, becoming known as "Fighting Bob" Evans. Though he evidently took pride in his nickname, his reputation for profanity also led to his being chastised by Leonard Woolsey Bacon, pastor of the Congregational Church in Litchfield, Connecticut, in a letter to The New York Times.

USS Indiana
The United States' first seagoing battleship, USS Indiana, was placed in commission on 20 November 1895, with Captain Evans in command. Former President Benjamin Harrison, with a committee from the state of Indiana, presented a set of silver to Evans for the battleship on 16 September 1896 at Tompkinsville, New York.

Spanish–American War service
During the Spanish–American War, he commanded the battleship  in the Battle of Santiago de Cuba.

Shore duty
Robley Dunglison Evans was named president of the Board of Inspection and Survey from February 1901 to April 1902.

Prince Henry of Prussia
President Theodore Roosevelt selected Admiral Robley D. Evans to host Prince Heinrich of Prussia, brother of Germany's Kaiser Wilhelm II. 15 February 1902, Admiral Evans, as Commander-in-Chief of a special honor squadron, hoisted his flag on the battleship  at the New York Navy Yard. Evans feted Prince Henry during the visit of the Kaiserliche Marine Imperial German Navy. After the departure of the German prince, 28 February 1902, Evans' flag was hauled down on Illinois.

Commander-in-Chief – Asiatic Fleet
Admiral Evans transferred his flag from armored cruiser,  on 4 November 1902 to battleship,  at Yokohama, Japan. On 5 December 1903, the Kentucky left Japanese waters for Hawaii; on 17 December 1903, the Kentucky arrived at Pearl Harbor Naval Station, Hawaii. Admiral Evans hosted a Christmas dinner for the officers of Kentucky at the Moana Hotel in Waikiki. 31 December 1903 Evans' flagship departed Honolulu for Guam. Kentucky arrived in Cavite, the Philippines, on 18 January 1904. Admiral Evans called on the new Governor-General of the Philippines, Luke Edward Wright, at the Malacanang Palace. Evans' flagship departed Manila on 13 March 1904. The Kentucky coaled at Hong Kong and Colombo. Sailing through the Suez Canal into the Mediterranean Sea to the port of Naples, Italy, the voyage continued to Gibraltar, coaling at Madeira; the flagship Kentucky arrived at the New York Navy Yard, 23 May 1904. Admiral Evans hauled down his flag, 27 May 1904 from  battleship Kentucky.

Commander-in-Chief – North Atlantic Fleet

On 31 March 1905, a 13-gun salute was fired by the battleship USS Maine at Pensacola, Florida, as the flag of Rear Admiral Robley D. Evans, Commander-in-Chief of the North Atlantic Fleet, was broken at the main mast. The fleet sailed on 7 May 1905 for Hampton Roads, Virginia. Admiral Evans returned to his alma mater the United States Naval Academy at Annapolis, Maryland, on 30 October 1905.

The British Fleet under command of Prince Louis of Battenberg arrived at Annapolis. On 1 November 1905, the Prince visited Evans on Maine.  Admiral Evans gave Prince Louis a tour of the Naval Academy and battleship Maine. A reception by Evans was held later in the week on the Maine for Governor Edwin Warfield of Maryland.

Admiral Evans on the flagship Maine sailed on 7 November 1905 from Annapolis to New York.  Admiral Evans stayed on board Maine during repairs from 20 November 1905 to January 1906. After winter quarters in Guantanamo Bay, Cuba, on 3 May 1906, Evans returned the fleet to New York.  On 2 September 1906, the Maine anchored next to the presidential yacht Mayflower off Oyster Bay, Long Island. President Theodore Roosevelt came on board Maine to confer with Evans. Admiral Evans on the Maine departed New York on 28 December for winter quarters in Cuban waters. On 15 April 1907, Evans' flagship Maine returned to Hampton Roads.  On 16 April 1907, Evans hauled down his flag on the Maine and then hoisted it on the battleship Connecticut, flagship for the world cruise.

The Great White Fleet
Rear Admiral Evans commanded the Great White Fleet 16 April 1907 from Hampton Roads, Virginia, in its passage from the Atlantic Ocean through the Straits of Magellan to the Pacific Ocean, where he was relieved of command in San Francisco, California, 9 May 1908, because of ill health.

Admiral Evans retired from the Navy upon reaching the mandatory retirement age of 62 on 18 August 1908.

He died in Washington, DC, on 3 January 1912.

Honors
Rear Admiral Evans was entitled to the Civil War Campaign Medal, Sampson Medal, and Spanish Campaign Medal.

Two destroyers, USS Evans (DD-78), launched 30 October 1918, and USS Evans (DD-552), launched 4 October 1942, were named in his honor.

Evans Avenue in San Francisco is named for him.

Dates of rank
 Acting midshipman, 20 September 1860
 Acting ensign, 1 October 1863
 Master, on Retired List, 10 May 1866
 Lieutenant on Retired List, 25 July 1866, Active List, 25 January 1867
 Lieutenant commander, 12 March 1868, Active List
 Commander, 12 July 1878
 Captain, 27 June 1893
 Rear admiral, 11 February 1901
 Retired List, 18 August 1908

Total time in service – 47 years, 10 months, 28 days

Gallery

References

Further reading

External links

 Biography of Rear Admiral Robley D. Evans, from Naval Historical Center's Online Library of Selected Images
 Biography of Rear Admiral Robley D. Evans, from Spanish–American War Centennial site
 
 

1846 births
1912 deaths
Union Navy officers
American military personnel of the Spanish–American War
United States Navy rear admirals
United States Naval Academy alumni
People from Floyd County, Virginia
People of Virginia in the American Civil War
Military personnel from Virginia